Simon Terodde (born 2 March 1988) is a German professional footballer who plays as a striker for Bundesliga club Schalke 04.

He is the current goalscoring record holder of the 2. Bundesliga, with 172 goals, having been the season top-scorer four times, for VfL Bochum in 2016, VfB Stuttgart in 2017, 1. FC Köln in 2019 and Schalke 04 in 2022, winning the division title with all but Bochum.

Football career

MSV Duisburg
Playing for MSV Duisburg, Terodde was the top goalscorer of the Under 19 Bundesliga West in the 2006–07 season scoring 21 goals. His first professional appearance for Duisburg came against FC Ingolstadt 04 in the 2. Bundesliga on 19 October 2008. 

In January 2009, he agreed to a contract extension until 2010 before joining Fortuna Düsseldorf of the 3. Liga on loan for the second half of the 2008–09 season.

1. FC Köln
After seven years, Terodde left Duisburg and signed a two-year contract with 1. FC Köln where he mostly played for the reserve team. In the summer of 2011 he joined Union Berlin on loan. In April 2012, he completed the transfer to Union Berlin on a permanent basis agreeing to a contract running until 2015.

VfL Bochum
In 2014, Terodde signed for VfL Bochum. He was the 2. Bundesliga top scorer in his second season with 25 goals in 33 games, including a hat-trick at 1. FC Heidenheim on the final day in a 4–2 win.

VfB Stuttgart
In June 2016, Terodde moved to VfB Stuttgart. He again became top-scorer in the 2016–17 2. Bundesliga (25 goals in 32 games) and the team was promoted as champions. On 6 November 2016, he scored a hat-trick in a 3–1 win over Arminia Bielefeld at the Mercedes-Benz Arena.

In May 2017, Terodde signed a new two-year contract with an option for a further season.

Return to Köln
On 20 December 2017, it was announced Terodde would return to former club 1. FC Köln from 1 January 2018. He signed a deal until 30 June 2021. He scored three times in his first two games, eventually finishing with five in 15 as the team were relegated in last place.

He scored four times on 19 August 2018, as Köln came from behind to win 9–1 at Berliner FC Dynamo in the first round of the cup. On September 28, 2018 he scored his 100th 2.Bundesliga goal in a 1–3 win against Arminia Bielefeld. He scored a total of 29 2. Bundesliga goals in 2018–19 season and won his third 2. Bundesliga top scorer title.

Hamburger SV
In August 2020, it was announced that Terodde would return to the second tier and join Hamburger SV on a free transfer, signing a one-year contract. With two braces in the first two games, he replaced Sven Demandt (121) as the record goalscorer in the single division 2. Bundesliga, played since 1981, with 122 goals. In the all-time top scorer list of the 2. Bundesliga, which has been played since 1974, Terodde is third behind Dieter Schatzschneider (153) and Karl-Heinz Mödrath (151).

Schalke 04
On 2 May 2021, Terodde agreed to join Bundesliga relegated Schalke 04 on a free transfer for the 2021–22 season with an option for a further year. He scored on his debut vs. his former club, Hamburger SV in a 3–1 loss.

On 3 October 2021, he scored his 11th goal of the season in a 3–0 win against FC Ingolstadt 04 on matchday 9, making him the record scorer in the 2. Bundesliga with 153 goals together with Dieter Schatzschneider. He became the sole record holder with his goal in a 1–1 draw against Werder Bremen on 20 November 2021. At the end of the season, he was promoted to the Bundesliga with Schalke and became the 2. Bundesliga top scorer for the fourth time with 30 goals in 30 appearances.

Career statistics

Honours

Club
VfB Stuttgart
 2. Bundesliga: 2016–17

1. FC Köln
 2. Bundesliga: 2018–19

Schalke 04
 2. Bundesliga: 2021–22

Individual
 2. Bundesliga top scorer: 2015–16, 2016–17, 2018–19, 2021–22

References

External links

 Profile at the FC Schalke 04 website
 

1988 births
Living people
People from Bocholt, Germany
Sportspeople from Münster (region)
Association football forwards
German footballers
MSV Duisburg II players
MSV Duisburg players
1. FC Köln II players
1. FC Köln players
Fortuna Düsseldorf II players
Fortuna Düsseldorf players
1. FC Union Berlin players
VfL Bochum players
VfB Stuttgart players
Hamburger SV players
FC Schalke 04 players
Bundesliga players
2. Bundesliga players
3. Liga players
Regionalliga players
Footballers from North Rhine-Westphalia